Love Shout is an album by jazz vocalist Etta Jones which was recorded in late 1962 and early 1963 and released on the Prestige label.

Reception

The Allmusic site awarded the album 2 stars but stated "Jones is in excellent form on a wide variety of material... Although Etta Jones' finest work was made for Muse in the 1970s and '80s, the appealing singer is in good form on this LP-length program".

Track listing 
 "Love Walked In" (George Gershwin, Ira Gershwin) – 2:30     
 "It's Magic" (Sammy Cahn, Jule Styne) – 4:44     
 "Like Someone in Love" (Johnny Burke, Jimmy Van Heusen) – 3:24     
 "The Gal from Joe's" (Duke Ellington, Irving Mills) – 4:07     
 "Hi-Lili, Hi-Lo" (Helen Deutsch, Bronisław Kaper) – 3:35     
 "If I Loved You" (Oscar Hammerstein II, Richard Rodgers) – 3:37     
 "There Are Such Things" (Stanley Adams, Abel Baer, George W. Meyer) – 4:54     
 "Some Day My Prince Will Come" (Frank Churchill, Larry Morey) – 3:01     
 "Old Folks" (Dedette Lee Hill, Willard Robison) – 4:13     
 "Some Enchanted Evening" (Hammerstein, Rodgers) – 2:25  
Recorded at Van Gelder Studio in Englewood Cliffs, New Jersey on November 28, 1962 (tracks 4–6), February 4, 1963 (tracks 7–10) and February 12, 1963 (tracks 1–3)

Personnel 
Etta Jones – vocals
Jerome Richardson – tenor saxophone (4), flute (tracks 5–6)
Kenny Cox (1–3 & 7–8,10), Sam Bruno (4) – piano
Larry Young (tracks 1–3 & 7–8,10), Sam Bruno (6) – organ
Kenny Burrell (1–10), Bucky Pizzarelli (tracks 4–6) – guitar
Ernest Hayes (tracks 4–6), Peck Morrison (tracks 1–3), George Tucker (tracks 7–10) – bass
Bobby Donaldson (tracks 4–6), Oliver Jackson (tracks 1–3), Jimmie Smith (tracks 7–10) – drums

References 

Etta Jones albums
1963 albums
Albums produced by Ozzie Cadena
Prestige Records albums
Albums recorded at Van Gelder Studio